Heikki Ilmari "Immu" Niemeläinen (December 16, 1910 – May 28, 1951) was a Finnish diver and architect. He was born in Jyväskylä and died in Helsinki.

At the 1936 Summer Olympics in Berlin he finished 13th in the 3 metre springboard event and 14th in the 10 metre platform competition. Twelve years later, at the 1948 Summer Olympics in London he finished 19th in the 10 metre platform event.

Art competitions formed part of the modern Olympic Games during its early years, from 1912 to 1948. In 1948, at the London Olympics, Niemeläinen won a bronze medal for his "Athletic Centre in Kemi, Finland".

References

External links
 Heikki Niemeläinen profile

1910 births
1951 deaths
People from Jyväskylä
People from Vaasa Province (Grand Duchy of Finland)
Finnish male divers
Olympic divers of Finland
Divers at the 1936 Summer Olympics
Divers at the 1948 Summer Olympics
Olympic bronze medalists in art competitions
20th-century Finnish architects
Medalists at the 1948 Summer Olympics
Olympic competitors in art competitions
Deaths from cancer in Finland